Shlomo Moussaieff (1925 – July 1, 2015) was an Israeli jeweler, of Bukharan Jewish descent, who was the grandson of the wealthy gemstone trader Rabbi Moussaieff from Uzbekistan. Founder of Moussaieff Jewellers Ltd., he and his wife and business partner, Alisa, were ranked No. 315 on the Sunday Times Rich List 2011, with a fortune estimated at £220 million. Moussaieff produced precious jewellery for international royalty and high society, including Western royalty as well as those from Saudi Arabia and Persian Gulf states. He spoke Arabic fluently. In addition, Moussaieff was regarded as one of the world's top private collectors of antiquities associated with the Bible and ancient Near East, with a collection of 60,000 artefacts.

Biography
Shlomo Moussaieff was the second of 12 children of Rehavia Moussaieff, a Jerusalem-born jewellery dealer. He was named after his grandfather, Shlomo Moussaieff, a wealthy Bukharan merchant who was one of the founders of the Bukharim neighbourhood in Jerusalem in 1891. Rehavia, who later traded in fine gems in Paris, introduced Shlomo to the jewellery trade at a young age. Shlomo's youngest brother, Alon, also became a Jerusalem jewellery dealer. Several of his sisters own jewellery stores: Hannah in Jerusalem's King David Hotel, Naomi in London and Aviva in Geneva.

His father, a strict disciplinarian, threw him out of the house at the age of 12 because he refused to apply himself to his studies. Moussaieff claims he had dyslexia and was unable to read and write. He began sleeping in synagogues, buses, and even the street, and worked for a carpenter in Sanhedria. After hours, he hung around the Second Temple-era Tombs of the Sanhedrin in the nearby park. Inside the caves, which were then open to the public, he discovered ancient coins that he sold to traders. He also carved up lead coffins and sold the lead in the Armenian Quarter. Apprehended and beaten by an Arab policeman, he was brought before an Arab judge and sentenced to nine months in a reform school in Tulkarm. He asked to learn in a madrassa, where he found it easy to learn the Koran by heart, and became familiar with Arab culture.

In 1940 Moussaieff joined the Etzel which opposed British rule in Palestine. Upon the recommendation of his Etzel leader, he joined the British Army at age 17 to fight Nazi Germany during World War II. Stationed in the Egyptian desert and Livorno, Italy, he searched through synagogue genizot (treasuries) during his free time and bought old Kabbalah manuscripts and marriage contracts written by well-known rabbis. In 1947 he rejoined the Etzel to battle the Arab Legion in the Old City of Jerusalem. When the city fell to the Jordanians in 1948, he was taken captive and imprisoned for one year in Transjordan. He married his wife, Alisa, an Austrian native, two weeks before he went into captivity.

Business career
After his release, Moussaieff worked in his family's jewellery store and opened his own antique jewellery shop in downtown Jerusalem. He supplemented his income by smuggling "gold and antiquities from Jordan to Israel" in the 1950s. During this time he came in contact with Moshe Dayan, another confirmed antiquities smuggler, and provided Dayan with artefacts in exchange for the use of Dayan's car for transporting smuggled goods. In 1954 he was detained under suspicion of stealing 1,000 coins and other antiquities from the Hebrew University of Jerusalem. Moussaieff claimed he had "paid full price" for the items, but would not disclose the seller. He was released after his wife returned the lot to the Jerusalem District Police.

In 1963 he moved to London and opened his first jewellery shop in the lobby of the London Hilton on Park Lane. He later opened another store on London's Bond Street. Sales increased in 1967 when wealthy Arabs from Saudi Arabia and the Persian Gulf began to buy jewelry in London. He and his wife operated the business in partnership; she managed sales while he designed the jewellery. In addition to diamonds, coloured gemstones, and natural pearls, Moussaieff re-set stones and pearls that he acquired at antique jewellery auctions into new jewellery designs.

Today Moussaieff Jewellers Ltd. has two London stores and a shop at the Grand Hotel Kempinski Geneve in Switzerland. Moussaieff's clients included government figures such as Imelda Marcos and Princess Ashraf and Princess Shams of Iran, and celebrities such as, Richard Burton, Elizabeth Taylor, Stavros Niarchos, Zsa Zsa Gabor, Joan Collins, Bob Cummings, Shirley MacLaine, George Raft, Peter Sellers and Frank Sinatra. In the late 1990s he developed a following among affluent Israelis.

Moussaieff's collection included rare stones such as the Moussaieff Blue Diamond, a flawless 6.04 carat stone that Alisa purchased at a 2007 Sotheby's auction in Hong Kong for $7.98 million, setting a world record in price per carat, with a final bid of $1.32 million per carat. The Moussaieff Red Diamond, a trilliant cut, 5.11 carat red diamond purchased in 2001 or 2002, is the world's largest known red diamond.

Moussaieff retired from the business in 2004 while his wife continued to oversee sales, designs and acquisitions.

Antiquities collection

Moussaieff was regarded as one of the foremost private collectors of antiquities of the Bible and ancient Near East. According to his own estimate, he owned 60,000 artefacts, specialising in ancient manuscripts and personal seals from the First and Second Temple periods.

Since he was willing to pay large sums for antiquities that proved the historical authenticity of the Bible, antiquities experts believe that some fakes and forgeries crept into in his collection. In 2004 Moussaieff testified as a victim in a forgery trial involving the James Ossuary and the Jehoash Inscription. Moussaieff had bought two ostracons (inscriptions on pottery shards) from Oded Golan, one of the defendants in the trial; these purchases were also determined to be forgeries. In March 2012 the defendants were acquitted of the forgery charges. Moussaieff was also involved in a seven-year lawsuit filed against him by the Republic of Iraq, accusing him of stealing artefacts from ancient Nineveh after the fall of Saddam Hussein. Though Moussaieff claimed he had bought the antiquities legitimately from a Swiss dealer, he returned them all to the Iraqi government to avoid undue publicity.

Recognition and awards
Moussaieff received an honorary degree from Bar Ilan University in 2000. The university announced his death in a statement on July 1, 2015.   Shlomo Moussaieff was 90.

Personal
Moussaieff and his wife resided on Grosvenor Square in the Mayfair district of London. They have three daughters:Their eldest, Dorrit, was the former First Lady of Iceland and is married to the former President of Iceland, Olafur Ragnar Grimsson. Their second daughter, Tamar, works in the business. Their third daughter is Sharon.

Works on Moussaieff's antiquities collection

 ]

References

External links
Moussaieff Jewellers Ltd. – Legal information (2011)

Israeli Jews
British Jews
Bukharan Jews
Israeli emigrants to the United Kingdom
Israeli businesspeople
Jews in Mandatory Palestine
People from Jerusalem
Businesspeople from London
Irgun members
British Army personnel of World War II
Israeli prisoners of war
1925 births
2015 deaths
People with dyslexia
20th-century English businesspeople